Thaba Tshwane is a military base (or military area) in Pretoria, South Africa.

Units and facilities
The oldest building in the complex is the South African Garrison Institute, what is now known as the Army College. Lord Kitchener laid the cornerstone on 12 June 1902.

Today the installation is home to:
 the South African Army College, 
 the South African National Defence College under Rear-Admiral Laura Janse van Vuuren, 
 the National Ceremonial Guard and Band, 
 the Military Police School, 
 1 Military Hospital, 
 Bagaka Regiment, 
 Ukhosi Parachute Engineer Regiment, 
 Madzhakandila Anti-Aircraft Regiment, 
 1 Military Printing Regiment, 
 Tshwane Regiment (Motorised Infantry), 
 Steve Biko Artillery Regiment (Artillery Formation) and 
4 Survey and Map Regiment.

Names and history
Founded around 1905 by the British Army, and called Roberts Heights after Field Marshal Lord Roberts. The area was subsequently renamed Voortrekkerhoogte ("Voortrekker Heights") in 1939 by the government of the Union of South Africa, following the beginning of the building of the nearby Voortrekker Monument, at a time of growing Afrikaner nationalism. On 19 May 1998, following the end of apartheid, it was renamed again, as  Thaba Tshwane. Thaba Tshwane should not be confused with the much larger City of Tshwane Metropolitan Municipality, created in 2000, which includes Pretoria and the Thaba Tshwane military base.

References

External links
The 1998 speech by South Africa's Minister of Defence on the renaming of Voortrekkerhoogte to Thaba Tshwane
Experiences at Voortrekkerhoogte Military base in 1984

Thaba Tshwane
Military installations of South Africa